The Diocese of Florida is a Latin Church ecclesiastical territory or diocese of the Catholic Church in southern Uruguay. It is a suffragan diocese in the ecclesiastical province (covering all Uruguay) of the metropolitan Archdiocese of Montevideo.
 
Its cathedra is a minor basilica, the Catedral Basílica de Nuestra Señora del Luján, dedicated to Our Lady of Luján, in the episcopal see of Florida, Uruguay.

The current bishop, Martín Pablo Pérez Scremini, was appointed in March 2008.

History 
 Established on 1931.08.11 as Diocese of Florida–Melo / Floriden(sis)–Melen(sis) (Latin), on territory split off from the suppressed Diocese of Melo (which was erected in 1897 on territory split off from the then Diocese of Montevideo)
 Renamed on 1955.11.15 as Diocese of Florida / Floriden(sis) (Latin), having lost territory to (re)establish a Diocese of Melo.
 Lost territory on 1960.10.22 to establish the Diocese of Tacuarembó.
 Enjoyed a Papal visit by Pope John Paul II in May 1988.

Statistics 
As per 2014, it pastorally served 91,500 Catholics (74.7% of 122,500 total) on 22,600 km² in 17 parishes and 72 missions with 29 priests (9 diocesan, 20 religious), 5 deacons, 70 lay religious (22 brothers, 48 sisters) and 1 seminarian.

Episcopal ordinaries
(all Roman Rite)

Suffragan Bishop of Florida–Melo  
 Miguel Paternain, Redemptorists (C.Ss.R.) (20 April 1929 – 15 November 1955 see below), previously Bishop of mother see Melo (Uruguay) (1929.04.20 – 1931.08.11)Suffragan Bishops of Florida  
 Miguel Paternain, Redemptorists (C.Ss.R.) (see above'' 15 November 1955 – retired 27 February 1960), emeritate first as Titular Bishop of Mades (1960.02.27 – 1960.09.21), then 'promoted' Titular Archbishop of Acrida (1960.09.21 – death 1970.10.19)
 Humberto Tonna Zanotta (5 July 1960 – retired 16 June 1987), also President of Episcopal Conference of Uruguay (1975 – 1979); died 1994
 Raúl Horacio Scarrone Carrero (15 June 1987 – retired 15 March 2008), also President of Episcopal Conference of Uruguay (1991 – 1994 & 1997 – 2000); previously Titular Bishop of Ulpiana (1982.10.13 – 1987.06.15) as Auxiliary Bishop of Archdiocese of Montevideo (Uruguay) (1982.10.13 – 1987.06.15)
 Martín Pablo Pérez Scremini (15 March 2008 – ...), previously Titular Bishop of Vazari (2004.03.06 – 2008.03.15) as Auxiliary Bishop of Archdiocese of Montevideo (Uruguay) (2004.03.06 – 2008.03.15).

See also 
 List of Catholic dioceses in Uruguay
 List of churches in the Diocese of Florida

References

External links 

 GCatholic, with Google satellite photo - data for all sections

Florida
Florida
Religion in Florida Department
Religion in Durazno Department
1897 establishments in Uruguay
Florida
Florida